The 1999 college football season may refer to:

 1999 NCAA Division I-A football season
 1999 NCAA Division I-AA football season
 1999 NCAA Division II football season
 1999 NCAA Division III football season
 1999 NAIA Football National Championship